Barry Mahy (21 January 1942 – 1 October 2020) was an English-American association football defender. He began his career with Scunthorpe United and finished it with the New York Cosmos. He also earned four caps with the U.S. national team in 1973.

Club career
While born in Doncaster, Mahy grew up on the island of Guernsey, a British crown dependency. He began his playing career with the Islanders, a non-FIFA affiliated "national" team. In 1963, Dick Duckworth, manager of English Second Division club Scunthorpe United signed Mahy. At the time Scunthorpe was performing poorly and Duckworth was attempting to rebuild the roster mid-season. Despite the changes, Scunthorpe finished at the bottom of the standings and was relegated at the end of the season. Mahy remained with the team through the 1966–1967 season, seeing time in only twenty-two games.  In October 1967 when he followed Scunthorpe manager Freddie Goodwin when he moved to the U.S. to coach the New York Generals of the National Professional Soccer League.   The NPSL merged with the United Soccer Association in 1968 to form the North American Soccer League. At the end of the 1968 season, the Generals folded. In 1971, Mahy signed with the expansion New York Cosmos and played five seasons with the team.

National team
While Mahy played for the Guernsey national football team, it is not recognized by FIFA. Therefore, he was eligible to play for other, recognized, teams. In 1973, he was called into the U.S. national team. His first game was a 1–0 loss to Haiti on 3 November 1973. He played three more games that November, his last with the national team coming in a 2–0 loss to Israel on 15 November 1973.

Death
Mahy died on 1 October 2020 of unknown causes, aged 78.

References

External links
Scunthorpe United profile
NASL stats

1942 births
2020 deaths
Footballers from Doncaster
Guernsey footballers
American soccer players
Association football fullbacks
English footballers
English emigrants to the United States
National Professional Soccer League (1967) players
New York Cosmos players
New York Generals players
New York Generals (NPSL) players
North American Soccer League (1968–1984) players
Scunthorpe United F.C. players
United States men's international soccer players
English expatriate sportspeople in the United States
Expatriate soccer players in the United States
English expatriate footballers